This is the discography of Slovak singer Zdenka Predná.

Albums

Studio albums

Single

Solo

Guest singles

Music videos

References 

Predna, Zdenka